The Telnarian Histories are a series of five space opera novels by American writer John Norman; the first three were published between 1991 and 1993. 
 
The setting of the novels is a galactic realm closely parallel to the later history of the Roman Empire and its wars with Germanic barbarians.  The ruling family of the empire is human, but extraterrestrials exist, while individuals pursue destinies of freedom and slavery.  The depiction of slavery in the books resembles that found in the Gor series, with female slaves dominated by male masters.

Books
The individual books in the series are:

 The Chieftain (1991) 
 The Captain (1992) 
 The King (1993)  
 The Usurper (2015)
 The Emperor (2019)

Reception 
The Telnarian Histories were critically and popularly regarded as an unfortunate deviation from Norman's Gor series.  One novel concept explored in the second and third books of the series is that Dira, the goddess of love and beauty in the pantheon of the Telnarian Empire, is also the goddess of slave girls and is herself enslaved among the gods.

External links
 

Science fiction book series
Gor
Book series introduced in 1991